Barton-le-Willows is a village and civil parish in the Ryedale district of North Yorkshire, England, situated near the River Derwent, about eight miles south-west of Malton.  The parish had a population (including Harton) of 186 according to the 2001 census increasing to 284 at the 2011 Census.  The village is recorded as Bartun in the Domesday Book.

The house in the picture is No. 5 Forge cottage the old blacksmiths. Woodpeckers visit the garden every day, house martins nest under the eaves and kingfishers live down by the river.

Barton-le-Willows pre-school playgroup is a registered charity, run from the village hall.   Led by an experienced playleader, pre-school learning is provided on Monday mornings for children aged 2–5.  A friendly playgroup for babies, toddlers and pre-school children, with their mothers, is provided every Friday morning.  Both sessions are open to children from this and surrounding areas.

Barton-le-Willows was served by Barton Hill railway station on the York to Scarborough Line between 1845 and 1930.

References

External links

 
 Official website

Villages in North Yorkshire
Civil parishes in North Yorkshire